The  (Book of Magic) is an Icelandic grimoire dated to ca. 1600. It is a small manuscript containing a collection of 47 spells and sigils/staves.

The grimoire was compiled by four people, possibly starting in the late 16th century and going on until the mid-17th century. The first three scribes were Icelanders, and the fourth was a Dane working from Icelandic material. The various spells consist of Latin and runic material as well as Icelandic magical staves, invocations to Christian entities, demons and the Norse gods, as well as instructions for the use of herbs and magical items. Some of the spells are protective, intended against such problems as trouble with childbearing, headache and insomnia, previous incantations, pestilence, suffering and distress at sea. Others are intended to cause fear, kill animals, find thieves, put someone to sleep, cause flatulence, or bewitch women.

The book was first published in 1921 by Natan Lindqvist in a diplomatic edition and with a Swedish translation. An English translation was published in 1989 by Stephen Flowers, and a facsimile edition with detailed commentary by Matthías Viðar Sæmundsson in 1992. In 1995 Flowers produced a second retitled edition of his book and with the assistance of Sæmundsson corrected many translations and added many more notes and commentaries.

Notes

References 
 
 
 
 

Grimoires
Germanic paganism
Icelandic folklore
Icelandic literature
Runology
Witchcraft in Iceland